Vitkovac may refer to:

Vitkovac (Aleksinac), a village in Serbia
Vitkovac (Knjaževac), a village in Serbia
Vitkovac (Kraljevo), a village in Serbia

People with the surname
Čedomir Vitkovac (born 1982), Serbian basketball player